Spain competed at the 1998 European Athletics Championships in Budapest, Hungary, from 18–23 August 1998.

Medals

Results

Men
Track & road events

Field events

Combined events – Decathlon

Women
Track & road events

Field events

Combined events – Heptathlon

Nations at the 1998 European Athletics Championships
1998
European Athletics Championships